Mayfied GAA Club (CLG Baile na mBocht) is a Gaelic Athletic Association club based in the Mayfield area of Cork City, Ireland. Teams are fielded in Gaelic football, hurling, and Ladies' Football. The club participates in Cork GAA competitions and in Seandún board competitions. In 2016/17, Mayfield were crowned Cork City (Seandún), Cork County, Munster and All-Ireland Junior Hurling Champions.

History

Club Foundation
Mayfield GAA Club was formed in 1893, with Michael Fleming as the first secretary of the club. The club competed at both Minor and Junior level in the early years with victories in various feiseanna and tournaments to which they had been invited. The club entered a trial period of merging with local clubs, Brian Dillon's and Sarsfields in 1903 to form a senior team. However, following various arguments and quarrels between members of each club, the trial period ended and each club went back to representing its respective area.

The Club’s progress mostly stopped following World War I, along with many other clubs throughout the country, as the members and players were constantly harassed and subsequently arrested by the British Forces. Another amalgamation was attempted between local clubs in the Mayfield and surrounding are in 1922.  On this occasion, Mayfield declined to merge because of the failed attempt at amalgamation in 1903.

1920–1969

Mayfield affiliated with the newly established City Division in the 1920s and made great progress in this decade, culminating in the winning of the City Division Junior Hurling Championship for the first time in 1935. The Club retained these titles in the three years that followed. The 1935 Cork Junior Hurling Championship final between Mayfield and Castlemartyr, became famous in that this final was played four times and never brought to conclusion. The County Board decided that no medals would be presented and both teams were suspended. Following the victories of the 1930s, many players retired from hurling which led to a lean period on the playing field. 1954 saw the first Mayfield Junior Football Team being entered into the City Division Junior Championship and League. This team did not have to wait too long for success, as in 1959, they tasted success in the City Division Junior ‘A’ Football Championship, beating St. Nicholas’ in the final.

In 1962, the Club moved the clubhouse to its present day location on Kerry Road. The club tasted success in hurling in the City Division Junior ‘A’ Hurling Championship in 1967, after a 32 year gap. The success of the Club’s underage structure was beginning to show as many of these players had begun with the Club in Street League competition ten years previous. Thy reached the County Final in 1969, but ultimately came up short against an excellent Kanturk side in what was a magnificent final.

1970-1989

The 1970s proved to be one of the most successful periods in the history of Mayfield GAA Club. This decade saw Mayfield claim a total of 18 titles at adult level across both codes, the most important of which being the Club’s County Final victory in hurling on 5 November 1978. This famous victory over Carrigtwohill was the first ever victory by a Mayfield team in an adult level County Final. This victory, however,  did not lead to greater times on the field and Mayfield experienced another lean period in the 1980s.

1990-2000

The 1990s saw the club experience a revival in fortunes. A major restructuring of the underage section under the leadership of Juvenile Chairman Seán McCarthy began to pay dividends, and the club won the Minor ‘A’ Championship in football and hurling in 1994, 1995 and 1996. A City Division Junior ‘A’ Football Championship followed in 1997, as well as the Junior ‘A’ Hurling Championship in 1999. Under the stewardship of Club Chairman John Brennan, major developments of the Club’s facilities took place. These included the complete upgrading of existing pitches at Lotabeg and the addition of two new pitches across the road. This also included the total refurbishment of the clubhouse on Kerry Road.

2000 Onwards

In January 2002, a new complex was built at the club grounds at Lotabeg which comprised an ultra-modern gym, a multi-purpose sports hall, a 400 seat viewing stand over the main pitch, and new dressing rooms. In January 2004, Cork County Board recognised the successful performances at Junior Football level over the previous few years and regraded the club to Premier Intermediate Football Status.

Mayfield GAA Club was thrust into national spotlight in 2008 when they were nominated to partake in a prime-time reality TV series on RTÉ called Celebrity Bainisteoir. The series involved various celebrities taking over as coaches of local Gaelic football teams and competing against each other. The Celebrity Bainisteoir for Mayfield was celebrity solicitor Gerald Kean. This opportunity gave the club incredible exposure and showed the club and its facilities in a positive light. The club progressed to the final of the competition by beating Crumlin of Dublin and Kiltimagh of Mayo. However, Mayfield was defeated in the final of the competition by a very strong Maryland team from Westmeath.

2010 and 2011 saw Mayfield win the City Division Junior ‘A’ Hurling Championship, beating local rivals Brian Dillons both years. In 2011, the club reached the final of the Cork County Junior ‘A’ Championship, losing narrowly to Charleville after a replay. In 2012, the intermediate footballers were relegated from the Premier Intermediate level to Intermediate level. This was a disappointing result for the club as it had done well in previous seasons at that level and had claimed victory in the Tom Creedon Cup in the very same year.

Further redevelopment of the club facilities at Lotabeg began in 2014. The small pitch next to the main pitch was sold and the funds received were used to redevelop the pitches across the road to include a sand-based pitch. The future of Mayfield GAA Club is bright when we consider the success of the Club at juvenile level over the past decade. Participation in Féile na nGael tournaments, as well as County Final victories at Fé14 and Fé16 level in 2004 and 2006 respectively. In 2015, the underage coaching structure of the Club received a huge boost when it was awarded Category Silver in the Lee Coaching Initiative, which recognises excellence in coaching standards at underage level.

City, County, Munster and All-Ireland Victory 2016/2017

The 2016/17 season will definitely go down as one of the best in Mayfield GAA Club's history. In October 2016, Mayfield defeated a fancied Sarsfields side in the County Final, in what is the second ever county championship victory at adult level in the club. A Munster title was added in December 2016, with victory over Ballyduff from Waterford. Mayfield became All-Ireland Junior Hurling Champions in February 2017 with a hard-fought win over the Kilkenny and Leinster champions, Mooncoin.

Achievements
All-Ireland Junior Club Hurling Championship (1) 2017
Munster Junior Club Hurling Championship (1) 2016
 Cork Junior Hurling Championship (2) 1978, 2016
 Cork City Junior Hurling Championship (11) 1935, 1967, 1969, 1971, 1978, 1999, 2002, 2005, 2010, 2011, 2016
 Cork City Junior Football Championship (7) 1959, 1968, 1975, 1997, 2000, 2001, 2003

References

Sources
Mayfield GAA Website
Seandún GAA Website
Cork GAA Website

Gaelic games clubs in County Cork
Hurling clubs in County Cork
Gaelic football clubs in County Cork